Aetrocantha is a genus of African orb-weaver spiders containing the single species, Aetrocantha falkensteini. It was  first described by Ferdinand Karsch in 1879, and has only been found in Central Africa.

References

Araneidae
Monotypic Araneomorphae genera
Spiders of Africa
Taxa named by Ferdinand Karsch